This Close is a dramedy series written by and starring deaf creators Shoshannah Stern and Josh Feldman that premiered on Sundance Now on February 14, 2018.

Background
This Close began as Fridays, Stern and Feldman's Kickstarter web series, and then premiered at the 2017 Sundance Film Festival's Episodic Showcase as The Chances. It was Sundance Now's first straight-to-series order, and centers on two deaf best friends navigating their twenties in Los Angeles. Josh Feldman and Shoshannah Stern are the first deaf TV showrunners. According to the creators, approximately 25 of the cast and crew are also deaf.

Stern says when they were coming up with a title for the TV show, the network kept trying to pitch "words [that] they were trying to use to capture the deaf experience, like 'The Sound of Silence' [or] 'Deaf Like Me.' But I said, 'I think we’re working backwards... instead of trying to find an English word that captures the deaf experience, we should be thinking of a sign'." Stern and Feldman came up with the title, This Close, as a translation for a sign that's "your index finger and your middle finger crossing." According to Stern, it's a sign that has many different translations: "We’re showing something that’s intertwined... [it's] a sign used for “best friends, “like this” or “this close”. So we came up with “this close” from that."

It was renewed for a second season in April 2018. This Close is developed and produced by Super Deluxe.

Cast

Main
Shoshannah Stern as Kate
Josh Feldman as Michael

Recurring
Colt Prattes as Ryan
Zach Gilford as Danny
Cheryl Hines as Stella
Nyle DiMarco as Ben Genovese
Moshe Kasher as Jacob
Marlee Matlin as Annie
Colleen Foy as Taylor
Marcia Cross as Blythe
Camryn Manheim as The Therapist
Steven Weber as Michael's Dad
Austin Nichols as Shep
Lisa Rinna as Ryan's Mom
Margaret Cho as Zagat
Millicent Simmonds as Emmaline
Marylouise Burke as Hollis
Jessica Tuck as Carol
Will Murden as Nathan
Colleen Foy as Taylor
Shaylee Mansfield as Margaret
Bryan Michael Nunez as Jimmy
John P. McGinty as Blaine
CJ Jones as Craig
Joseph Haro as Noah
Dot-Marie Jones as Judy/Judith

Episodes

Season 1 (2018)

Season 2 (2019)

Reception
This Close is the first television series created, written by and starring deaf artists and has garnered attention for its representation of the deaf community. Mike Hale of The New York Times called it "funny and poignant in ways we haven't seen before...deftly directed and impressively cast." It was featured on Vulture's "Best Shows of 2018" list and was described as a "terrific, quietly groundbreaking series."

References

2018 American television series debuts
2019 American television series endings
2010s American comedy-drama television series
Deaf culture in the United States
Sundance TV original programming
Television shows about deaf people